is a Japanese actor. He is represented with Burning Production.

Biography
In the 25th Junon Super Boy Contest in 2012, he won the Grand Prix from among 13,816 total applicants.

He made his acting debut in 2014, in the daytime band drama Ao no Umi: Long Summer.

In 2017, he starred in his first main character role in a television drama Kamen Rider Build., which is also the second time he would work alongside fellow actor Kouhei Takeda, whom appeared alongside him in TBS drama Hotel Concierge.

Personal life
His hobbies are listening to music and watching DVDs. 

His special skills are 110 metres hurdle and playing the guitar. In hurdling, he won 6th place in the prefecture in a newcomer match.

For the audition to play the main character in "Kamen Rider Build", he obtained a motorcycle license but producers prevented him from riding one during filming over safety concerns. He also has experience in shoot boxing, and in Kamen Rider Build he incorporates these fighting pose elements into his transformation poses.

He Graduated from Tokushima Prefectural Tomioka Nishi High School.

Filmography

TV dramas

Film

Recitation dramas

References

External links

 

21st-century Japanese male actors
1994 births
People from Tokushima Prefecture
Living people